The Palisades Tahoe Aerial Tram (originally called the Squaw Valley Aerial Tramway) is a  long cable car at the Palisades Tahoe ski resort in Olympic Valley, California. It was inaugurated in 1968. It carries passengers from the Base Camp at 6200ft/1889m elevation to High Camp at 8200ft/2499m elevation.

1978 disaster
During a blizzard in 1978 a car carrying 44 passengers became dislodged from one of the two cables. It fell 75 feet before the second cable halted its fall, causing the car to bounce back up.

The cable that had become disconnected sprung upwards, and broke its connection to the tower. The 17 ton cable fell downwards slicing into the car as in bounce on the first cable, instantly killing three passengers. The final casualties were 4 killed and 22 injured.

References

Aerial tramways in the United States
Transportation buildings and structures in Placer County, California
Transportation buildings and structures in California
1968 establishments in California
Olympic Valley, California
Tram accidents
Transport disasters